Dry Creek is a stream located in Jefferson County, Missouri, United States.

A 2006 survey by the Missouri Department of Natural Resources found the creek to be shallow and clear, with numerous fish in places.

References

Rivers of Jefferson County, Missouri
Rivers of Missouri